{| class="infobox" style="width: 30em; font-size: 90%; text-align: left"
|-
! colspan="2" style="text-align:center; font-size: larger; background-color: #001; color: #ffa;" | RS423
|-
! Standard
| EIA RS-423
|-
! Physical Media
| Group of copper cables
|-
! Network Topology
| Point-to-point, Multi-dropped
|-
! Maximum Devices
| 10 (1 driver & 10 receivers)
|-
! Maximum Distance
| 1200 meters (4000 feet)
|-
! Mode of Operation
| Single-ended (unbalanced)
|-
! Maximum Baud Rate
| Up to 100kbit/s
|-
! Voltage Levels
| -6V to +6V (maximum)
|-
! Mark(1)
| -4V to -6V
|-
! Space(0)
| +4V to +6V
|-
! Available Signals
| Tx, Rx, GND
|-

! Connector types
| Not specified
|}
RS-423, also known as TIA/EIA-423, is a technical standard originated by the Electronic Industries Alliance that specifies electrical characteristics of a digital signaling circuit. Although it was originally intended as a successor to RS-232C  offering greater cable lengths, it is not widely used. It is closely related to RS-422, which used the same signaling systems but on a different wiring arrangement. RS-423 differed primarily in that it had a single return pin instead of one for each data pin.

RS-423 specifies an unbalanced (single-ended) interface, similar to RS-232, with a single, unidirectional sending driver, and allowing for up to 10 receivers.   It is normally implemented in integrated circuit technology and can also be employed for the interchange of serial binary signals between DTE & DCE.

Standard scope
RS-423 is the common short form title of American National Standards Institute (ANSI) standard ANSI/TIA/EIA-423-B Electrical Characteristics of Unbalanced Voltage Digital Interface Circuits  and its international equivalent ITU-T Recommendation T-REC-V.10, also known as X.26.  These technical standards specify the electrical characteristics of the unbalanced voltage digital interface circuit. RS-423 provides for data transmission, using unbalanced or single-ended signals, with unidirectional/non-reversible, terminated or non-terminated transmission lines, point to point, or multi-drop.

Characteristics 

RS-423 is closely related to the RS-422 standard, both of which use the same overall signaling system, but differ in that 422 has a dedicated return line for every data pin, while 423 uses a single return line. Use of a common ground is one weakness of RS-423 (and RS-232): if devices are far enough apart or on separate power systems, the ground will degrade between them and communications will fail, resulting in a condition that is difficult to trace.

RS-423 specifies the electrical characteristics of a single unbalanced signal.  The standard was written to be referenced by other standards that specify the complete DTE/DCE interface for applications which require a unbalanced voltage circuit to transmit data.  These other standards would define protocols, connectors, pin assignments and functions.  Standards such as EIA-530 (DB-25 connector) and EIA-449 (DC-37 connector) use RS-423 electrical signals.

Applications 
The BBC Micro computer uses RS-423 with a 5-pin DIN connector.  DEC used it extensively with a Modified Modular Jack connector.  This was sometimes called "DEC-423".

See also
 Electronic Industries Alliance
 RS-485
 Profibus
 Fieldbus
 List of network buses

References

Further reading

 RS-423 specification
 Diagram of pin connections for BBC micro

Serial buses
EIA standards